SMS S32 was a  large torpedo boat of the Imperial German Navy that served during the First World War. She was built by the Schichau-Werke shipyard in Elbing, East Prussia, being launched on 28 February 1914 and was completed in September that year.

S32 survived the war, and was scuttled at Scapa Flow in 1919.

Construction and design
In 1913, the Imperial German Navy decided to build larger and more seaworthy torpedo boats in place of the smaller s that had been ordered in 1911 and 1912, which had not proved successful. The new, larger, designs would, as well as being more seaworthy, carry a heavier armament and would be oil-fueled only, rather than use the mix of oil- and coal-fueled boilers that German torpedo boats had used up to then. As was normal, orders were placed for a flotilla of 12 torpedo boats in the 1913 fiscal year, with 6 each ordered from AG Vulcan (V25–V30) and Schichau-Werke (S31–S36). The two groups of torpedo boats were of basically similar layout but differed in detailed design.

The ship was armed with three 8.8 cm (3.4 in) L/45 guns and six 50 cm (19.7 in) torpedo tubes, with two single tubes forward and two twin tubes aft of the ship's funnels, with the twin tubes angled out by 15 degrees. Up to 24 mines could be carried. The ship had a crew of 83 officers and men.

S32, yard number 907, was launched on 28 February 1914 and was completed on 10 September that year.

Service
On 12 February 1915, five torpedo boats of the 9th Torpedo Boat Flotilla, including S32, were deployed to screen minesweeping operations near the Amrum Bank in the North Sea. When V25 did not return from this operation, a search found wreckage north of Helgoland. At the time it was believed that she had been sunk by a British submarine, with S32 claiming to have sighted a periscope, but in fact, no British submarines were in the vicinity, and V25 had probably been sunk by a British mine. All 79 of her crew were lost. On 23 March 1915, S32 took part in operations in the Baltic Sea off the coast of East Prussia and Lithuania, supporting a bombardment by German cruisers north of Memel. In August 1915, S32 took part in the Battle of the Gulf of Riga, an attempt by German forces, supported by the High Seas Fleet, to enter the Gulf of Riga, destroy Russian naval forces in the Gulf and to mine the northern entrances to the Gulf in order to prevent Russian reinforcement. On 20 August, in one of the last actions of the battle, S32 took part in an attack on Pernau, with blockships being used to block the entrance to the harbour.

S32 took part in the Battle of Jutland on 31 May–1 June 1916, sailing as part of the 1st Half-Flotilla of the 1st Torpedo Boat Flotilla, but later in the battle transferring to the 3rd Torpedo Boat Flotilla. S32, operating on the starboard beam of the battleship , was hit by splinters from shells fired by British battleships towards the end of the "run to the north".  The 3rd Torpedo Boat Flotilla launched an unsuccessful torpedo attack against British Battlecruisers at about 18:37, with S32 firing four torpedoes (all of which missed), while also exchanging fire with the crippled British destroyer  before and after the attack and was hit on the forecastle by a shell from Shark. Later on, the Germans launched a series of torpedo boat attacks against the British battle line to cover the escape of the German battleships, with S32 taking part in this attack and launching a single torpedo.  At about 23:30, the British 11th Destroyer Flotilla encountered German warships, and the destroyer  flashed a challenge to them to determine if they were British or German. The Germans, including S32 responded with heavy gunfire, and Tipperary was badly damaged and later sunk. S32 was hit by two British 4-inch (102 mm) shells, one of which severed a steam-pipe in the aft boiler room, temporarily immobilising S32, although she later restored power and safely reached port. Three of S32s crew were killed and one wounded during the battle.

S32 was part of the 1st Torpedo Boat Flotilla during the inconclusive Action of 19 August 1916, when the German High Seas Fleet sailed to cover a sortie of the battlecruisers of the 1st Scouting Group.

Scuttling
After the end of hostilities, S32 was interned at Scapa Flow and was scuttled along with most of the rest of the High Seas Fleet on 21 June 1919 in Gutter Sound. She was raised by Cox and Danks on 19 June 1925 and sold for scrap.

References

 
 
 
 
 
 

 

 

Torpedo boats of the Imperial German Navy
World War I torpedo boats of Germany
1914 ships
Ships built in Elbing
Ships built by Schichau